The Valencia Huracanes or Los Huracanes are a Spanish rugby league club, based in Valencia. They have applied to join the Rugby Football League's League 1 competition. During 2020 they have exhibition matches scheduled and will compete in the Espana Rugby league with a focus on developing Spanish players. They were announced as one of the teams comprising the inaugural Euro XIII Cup competition in 2022.

History
The club was first formed in 2019 by Dean Buchan, an English businessman who formed a consortium which submitted a proposal to compete in Rugby Football League competition. Their goal for 2020 is to form a competitive squad to be able to compete in 2021 in League One. They planned to stage a double header with Super League XXIV finalists St. Helens and Salford Red Devils but that fell through and they instead hosted a standalone fixture against the Featherstone Rovers, which they lost 102–14.

Current squad
Inaugural squad vs Featherstone Rovers

Results

See also

 Spanish Rugby League Association
 Spain national rugby league team

References

External links

Rugby clubs established in 2019
2019 establishments in Spain
Spanish rugby league teams
Proposed sports teams
Euro XIII